Gregg Barnes is an American costume designer for stage and film. Barnes is a two-time winner of the Tony Award for Best Costume Design in a Musical for his work on the Broadway  productions of The Drowsy Chaperone (2006) and Follies (2011).

Education
Barnes has a MFA in Design from New York University and an undergraduate degree from San Diego University.

Career
Barnes grew up in the San Diego, California area and credits seeing the circus, ice shows, and a local production of As You Like It in his youth as his inspiration to pursue a career in the theatre. He worked at Grossmont College in the Costume Department with other costume designers and artists such as Clark Mires, James "Biff" Baker, and Rebecca McKee. He taught at the New York University graduate school for 20 years. Barnes served as the resident costume designer for Paper Mill Playhouse, in Millburn, New Jersey for 9 years.

Broadway credits
Side Show (1997)
Flower Drum Song (2002)
Dirty Rotten Scoundrels (2005)
The Drowsy Chaperone (2006)
Legally Blonde (2007)
To Be Or Not To Be  (2008)
Bye Bye Birdie  (2009)
Elf the Musical (2010)
Follies (2011)
 Elf the Musical (2012)
Kinky Boots (2013)
Aladdin (2014)
Something Rotten! (2015)
Tuck Everlasting (2016)
Mean Girls (2017)

Other credits

Kathy and Mo Show (Westside Arts Theater, New York City, 1989)
Cinderella (New York City Opera, 1993)
The Merry Widow (New York City Opera, 1996; also televised)
You Never Know (Paper Mill Playhouse, Millburn, New Jersey, 1996)
The Wizard of Oz (Madison Square Garden, New York, New York, 1997)
Follies (Paper Mill Playhouse, Millburn, New Jersey, 1998)
Ringling Bros. and Barnum & Bailey Circus (National tour, 2001)
Princess Classics on Ice (Disney on Ice tour, 2002)
The Radio City Christmas Spectacular (2003)
Lucky Duck (Old Globe Theatre, San Diego, California, 2004)
On the Record (US tour, 2004)
Allegro (Signature Theatre, Arlington, Virginia, 2004; Helen Hayes Award)Disney Live! Winnie the Pooh (Beacon Theatre, New York City, 2005)Mame (Kennedy Center, 2006)Follies (Encores!, 2007)Minsky's (Ahmanson Theatre, Los Angeles, California, 2009)Follies (Kennedy Center, 2011)
"Iceploration", Busch Gardens Tampa, FL (February 2, 2012), Theme ParkDreamgirls'', Savoy Theatre, London (November 2016)

Awards and nominations

References

Citations

External links
 
 
Interview, Dec 1, 2004, at livedesignonline.com

Year of birth missing (living people)
Living people
Drama Desk Award winners
American costume designers
Tony Award winners
Tisch School of the Arts faculty
People from San Diego
Tisch School of the Arts alumni
Helpmann Award winners
Laurence Olivier Award winners